Retroactive may refer to:

 Retroactive (album), an album by Grand Puba
 Retro-active, an album by Karizma
 Retro Active, an album by Def Leppard
 Retroactive (film), a 1997 movie starring James Belushi and Kylie Travis

See also
 
 Retroactive law, another term for ex post facto law
 Retroactive data structures, datum structures that allow modifications to past actions
 Retroactive continuity in fiction
 Retrospective, often synonymous when used as an adjective